Filestan (also Romanized as Fīlestān and Fīlistān) is a village in Filestan Rural District, in the Central District of Pakdasht County, Tehran Province, Iran. At the 2006 census, its population was 4,476, in 1,121 families.

References 

Populated places in Pakdasht County